Miobalaenoptera is an extinct genus of rorqual from the Late Miocene (Messinian) of Japan.

Description 
Miobalaenoptera is distinguished from other rorquals (both extinct and extant) in the features of the earbone (incl. periotic) as well strongly diverging basioccipital crests 

The holotype specimen was found in marine deposits in Numata town, Hokkaido, Japan. It was initially assigned to Balaenoptera cf. acutorostrata by Shinohara (2012) and thought to be Pliocene in age, but analysis of diatoms in the matrix and preparation showed it to not only late Miocene but also a distinct species of extinct rorqual.

References 

Miocene cetaceans
Prehistoric cetacean genera
Miocene mammals of Asia
Fossil taxa described in 2019